DanceSport South Africa (DanceSport SA) (DSSA), formerly the Federation of Dance Sport South Africa (FEDANSA), is the governing body for dancesport and related dance styles in South Africa. It is an full member of the world governing body World DanceSport Federation (WDSF) and recognised by SASCOC. DanceSport SA is the sole custodian and controlling body of organised dancesport in South Africa.

DanceSport SA organises national competitions such as National Hip-Hop Championships and the National Achievers & Championships where provincial contestants compete for national honours.

Federation of DanceSport South Africa (FEDANSA) was formed in 1994 after integration of former Black and White structures in South Africa. This was in response to political changes that were taking place in South Africa towards democracy.

FEDANSA is the official controlling structure and sole custodian of DanceSport and related dance styles in South Africa, issuing Provincial and Protea colours in South Africa.

In 2014 after 20 years of South African democracy and the birth of Federation of DanceSport South Africa known as FEDANSA.  It was time for the federation to revise its long-awaited look by designing a new logotype for the Federation of DanceSport South Africa. The logo had to identify the South African DanceSport unity and incorporate South African gold and green national sport colours.
The design was to introduce the new name DANCESPORT SOUTH AFRICA a change that   is representative   of all dance forms that are recognised   by SASCOC and to be adaptable to an imminent restructure of the organisation.
DANCESPORT SOUTH AFRICA is member of the South African Confederation of Sports and Olympic Committee (SASCOC), founding member of the South African DanceSport Federation (a Zone Six DanceSport Structure) and World DanceSport Federation (WDSF) which is the only International DanceSport Organisation recognized by International Olympics Committee (IOC), General Association of International Sports Federations (GAISF), International World Games Association (IWGA) and Association of the IOC Recognized Sports Federations (ARISF).

DANCESPORT SOUTH AFRICA’s main members are provinces and Associate Members. Different commissions take care of interests’ groups and experts and facilitate access and growth of DanceSport. These are DanceSport Technical Commission, Disabled DanceSport Commission, School Sport Commission and Athletes' Commission.

DanceSport is one of the most graceful sports, where men and women compete on equal terms – a 100% gender parity. It is a team sport danced in partnership between man and woman using required technique together with floor craft and artistic interpretation to produce highly disciplined dance performance. DanceSport developed out of the narrow confines of Ballroom dancing but today includes any dance style which has achieved internationally recognized competition structure and has adopted a sport-based culture. DanceSport has grown tremendously in the past few years, particularly in townships and rural areas. This is attributed to the fact that the sport was foreign to these communities for a long time.

Following IOC recognition, the World DanceSport Federation (WDSF) continues to work for the inclusion of DanceSport as a medal sport in the Olympic Games. There is a clear correlation between DanceSport and the existing Olympic Winter sport of Ice Dancing, and there is no doubt that DanceSport will become one of the popular tele-sports.

See also
Dancesport
Sport in South Africa

References

External links
Official website
WDSF website

Dancesport in South Africa
Sports governing bodies in South Africa